Maan Abdul Wahed Al-Sanea (born 1955, Khobar, Saudi Arabia) is a Saudi businessman of Kuwaiti origin. In 1980, he founded the Saad Group, a conglomerate with operations in construction & engineering, real estate development, financial services and investments. He has also founded a private hospital, several educational facilities and a support center for special-needs children and their families. It is alleged that he funded all this by defrauding his wife's family, the  Al Gosaibis.

Al-Sanea’s family investment company, Saad Investments Co. Ltd. collapsed in 2009 and remains involved in a lengthy liquidation process, including the case Singularis Holdings Limited (in liquidation) v Daiwa Capital Markets Europe Limited.

In October, 2017, he was arrested in his home in Saudi Arabia.

References

20th-century Saudi Arabian businesspeople
21st-century Saudi Arabian businesspeople
1955 births
Living people
Saudi Arabian billionaires
Saudi Arabian prisoners and detainees
People from Khobar